Bear Creek Mining Corporation is a junior mining exploration company headquartered in Vancouver, Canada. The company is headed by Chairman Andrew Swarthout and President and CEO Anthony Hawkshaw. It is a publicly traded company whose stock is listed on the TSX Venture Exchange as BCM.

About 
All of the company's major assets are proposed mining projects in Peru. Its largest active project is the proposed Corani silver-lead-zinc mine. The Santa Ana Silver Project in the Huacullani District of Peru's Puno Region was a focus of regionwide protests, culminating in the revoking of Bear Creek's concession in 2011. Bear Creek is pursuing compensation for the loss of the project through the International Centre for Settlement of Investment Disputes. The Corani prospect was purchased from Rio Tinto in two portions in 2008 and 2011. Feasibility studies for Corani were published in 2011 and 2015. They estimated the mine could produce 13.4 million ounces of silver annually in its first five years of production and an average of 8.4Moz per year over its 18-year viable period of production. The mine would also produce lead and zinc concentrates.

See also 
List of mines in Peru

Zinc mining

External links  
 Bear Creek Mining Corporation

References 

Mining companies of Canada
Mining in Peru